Madame Rani (Urdu ) is a 1995 Pakistani Punjabi language action film, Directed by Masood Butt and produced by Haji Mohammad Aslam, the film stars actors Nadeem, Anjuman, Sultan Rahi, Ghulam Mohiuddin, Reema Khan and Nargis.

Cast
 Anjuman as (Madam Rani)
 Nadeem as Mr. Baig
 Sultan Rahi as Kali
 Ghulam Mohiuddin
 Reema
 Jan Rembo
 Nargis (Nargis won the Nigar Award for 'Best Suuporting Actress' in this film)
 Babar 
 Tariq Shah
 Humayun Qureshi as Tadiwal
 Ilyas Kashmiri as Justice
 Majeed Zarif
 Afshan Qureshi
 Nasrullah Butt 
 Masood Akhtar
 Saleem Hasan

Music
The music of the film is by musician Tafoo. The lyrics are penned by Khawaja Pervez.

Track listing

References

External links
 

1990s crime action films
Pakistani crime action films
Lollywood
1995 films
1990s Urdu-language films
Nigar Award winners
Urdu-language Pakistani films
Punjabi-language Pakistani films